CanalOlympia is an African-wide cinemas and theater company. The company has cinema theaters in Benin, Burkina Faso, Senegal, Nigeria, Rwanda, Togo, Gabon, Guinea and Cameroon, among others.

History
The CanalOlympia cinema company first originated in 2017.

On April 27, 2018, it was announced in Paris, France, that Orange and Vivendi had signed an agreement with CanalOlympia, whereupon Orange's "Cinedays" program would be made available for viewership to clients visiting CanalOlympia movie theaters.

During 2018, the company opened its tenth facility and second one in the city of Lome, Togo.

External links

2017 establishments in Africa
Movie theatre chains in Africa
Mass media companies of Africa
Pan-African media companies